The  1997 Big 12 Championship Game was a college football game played on Saturday, December 6, 1997, at the Alamodome in San Antonio. This was the 2nd Big 12 Championship Game and determined the 1997 champion of the Big 12 Conference. The game featured the Nebraska Cornhuskers, champions of the North division, and the Texas A&M Aggies, champions of the South division.

Teams

Nebraska

Texas A&M

Game summary

Statistics

References

Championship Game
Big 12 Championship Game
Nebraska Cornhuskers football games
Texas A&M Aggies football games
American football competitions in San Antonio
December 1997 sports events in the United States
1997 in sports in Texas
20th century in San Antonio